Kent Smith is a Canadian politician, who was elected to the Nova Scotia House of Assembly in the 2021 Nova Scotia general election. He represents the riding of Eastern Shore as a member of the Progressive Conservative Association of Nova Scotia.

He is an entrepreneur and active community volunteer.

References

Year of birth missing (living people)
Living people
Progressive Conservative Association of Nova Scotia MLAs
21st-century Canadian politicians